The 1998 Spanish Grand Prix was a Formula One motor race held on 10 May 1998 at the Circuit de Catalunya. It was the fifth race of the 1998 Formula One season. The 65-lap race was won by McLaren driver Mika Häkkinen after he started from pole position. His teammate David Coulthard finished second and Ferrari driver Michael Schumacher took third.

Race summary

Mika Häkkinen qualified in pole position, 0.7 seconds ahead of his McLaren teammate David Coulthard in second place, with Ferrari's Michael Schumacher a further 0.8 seconds behind in third. The race proved to be a formality for Häkkinen, winning the race ahead of Coulthard in second, and Schumacher in third.

Arrows driver Pedro Diniz started from the pit lane due to stalling on the warm up lap. At the start the McLarens got away well, but Schumacher made a poor start and fell back to fifth behind his teammate Eddie Irvine and Benetton's Giancarlo Fisichella. They ran in these positions until the first round of pit stops, when Irvine delayed Fisichella sufficiently for his teammate Schumacher to emerge ahead of them both and regain third. Fisichella and Irvine continued to battle until lap 28, when Fisichella attempted a passing manoeuvre around the outside of Irvine, resulting in a collision spearing them both off into the gravel trap. This led to Fisichella's Benetton teammate, Alexander Wurz, inheriting fourth place which he held until the finish. Mika Häkkinen was consistently faster than his teammate David Coulthard throughout the race weekend, unable to match his pace, even though they were in the same car. Respected ex driver and pundit Martin Brundle made the comment that Häkkinen was "in a class of his own".

During the race, Michael Schumacher and Minardi's Esteban Tuero were given 10 second stop-go penalties for pit lane speeding.

The Stewart of Rubens Barrichello earned two points by finishing in fifth place, which were team's first of the season, this was made possible by the new engine and chassis the team used (however teammate Jan Magnussen ran with the old chassis). Reigning World Champion Jacques Villeneuve finished in sixth place, after Williams had their worst qualifying result since the 1989 United States Grand Prix.

On the final lap, Williams driver Heinz-Harald Frentzen passed Prost's Jarno Trulli for eight place when Trulli was incorrectly shown the blue flags as the marshalls had mistaken the Williams for a Ferrari.

"I am truly angry because I had to give up a great battle, and it isn't fair to lose a position because they are blind and can't recognise one car from another. Of course it doesn't matter much to finish eighth or ninth, but for a racer it matters. In a case of a blue flag I didn't have an alternative". Jarno Trulli

Post race, Fisichella was given a $7,500USD fine for the collision with Irvine.

Classification

Qualifying

Race

Championship standings after the race

Drivers' Championship standings

Constructors' Championship standings

 Note:       Only the top five positions are included for both sets of standings.

References 

Spanish Grand Prix
Spanish Grand Prix
Grand Prix
May 1998 sports events in Europe